The UK Singles Chart is one of many music charts compiled by the Official Charts Company that calculates the best-selling singles of the week in the United Kingdom. Before 2004, the chart was only based on the sales of physical singles with airplay figures and digital downloads excluded from the official chart. This list shows singles that peaked in the Top 10 of the UK Singles Chart during 2002, as well as singles which peaked in 2001 and 2003 but were in the top 10 in 2002. The entry date is when the single appeared in the top 10 for the first time (week ending, as published by the Official Charts Company, which is six days after the chart is announced).

Two hundred and sixteen singles were in the top ten in 2002. Ten singles from 2001 remained in the top 10 for several weeks at the beginning of the year, while "Sk8er Boi" by Avril Lavigne was released in 2002 but did not reach its peak until 2003. Fifty-one artists scored multiple entries in the top 10 in 2002. Blazin' Squad, Busted, Holly Valance, Pharrell Williams and Shakira were among the many artists who achieved their first UK charting top 10 single in 2002.

The 2001 Christmas number-one, "Somethin' Stupid" by Robbie Williams and Nicole Kidman, remained at number-one for the first week of 2002. Daniel Bedingfield's "Gotta Get thru This" returned to number-one in January after previously occupying the top spot for two weeks in December 2001. The first new number-one single of the year was "More Than a Woman" by the late Aaliyah, who was killed in a plane crash in August 2001. Overall, thirty-two different singles peaked at number-one in 2002, with Gareth Gates and Will Young (both 3) having the most singles hit that position.

Background

Multiple entries
Two hundred and sixteen singles charted in the top 10 in 2002, with two-hundred and five singles reaching their peak this year.

Fifty artists scored multiple entries in the top 10 in 2002. Four artists had the joint most top ten singles in 2002 with four. American singer Ashanti's "Foolish" was her only solo single of her top ten entries, peaking at number four. Of her collaborations, "What's Luv?" with Fat Joe, and "Down 4 U" alongside Irv Gotti, The Inc., Ja Rule, Charlie Baltimore and Vita both reached number four. A fourth hit, "Always on Time" also with Ja Rule reached number six.

Pop Idol winner Will Young and runner-up Gareth Gates both had four top tens in 2002. Young had two number-one hits on his own, including "Anything is Possible"/"Evergreen" and "Light My Fire". His Children in Need single "Don't Let Me Down"/"You and I" just missed out on the top spot, peaking at number two. Young and Gates got together to record a cover of The Beatles song "The Long and Winding Road" which landed at the top spot. 

Young's competition rival Gates had three top 10 singles in his own right. Debut single "Unchained Melody" and follow-up "Anyone of Us (Stupid Mistake)" were chart toppers, while a third song, album title track "What My Heart Wants to Say" reached number five. Gates also recorded a version of Elvis Presley's "Suspicious Minds", which featured on "The Long and Winding Road" single as a double-A side.

The final four-time entrants to the top ten this year were S Club Juniors, a spinoff group from the successful S Club 7 (renamed as S Club in March 2002). Beginning with "One Step Closer", which got to number two, they achieved further chart fame as "Automatic High" and "New Direction" equalled that placing. Christmas double single "Puppy Love/Sleigh Ride" rounded off their year, peaking in sixth position.

Rapper Eminem was one of a number of artists with three top-ten entries, including number ones "Without Me" and "Lose Yourself". Atomic Kitten, Daniel Bedingfield, Oasis, Ronan Keating, Sugababes and Westlife were among the other artists who had multiple top 10 entries in 2002.

Chart debuts
Eighty-nine artists achieved their first top 10 single in 2002, either as a lead or featured artist. Of these, twelve went on to record another hit single that year: Avril Lavigne, Blazin' Squad, Darius, Flip & Fill, Holly Valance, Lasgo, Milk Inc., Moony, Ms. Dynamite, Nickelback, Scooter and Shakira. Three artists achieved two more chart hits in 2002: Chad Kroeger, Christina Milian and H & Claire (as a duo). Ashanti, Gareth Gates, S Club Juniors and Will Young all had three other entries in their breakthrough year.

The following table (collapsed on desktop site) does not include acts who had previously charted as part of a group and secured their first top 10 solo single. 

Notes
Darren Hayes was one of the participants on the Artists Against AIDS Worldwide (known as All Star Tribute in the UK) charity single "What's Going On" which reached number six in 2001, but "Insatiable" was his first official credited top 10 single. H & Claire performed together as a duo for the first time in 2002, reaching the top 10 on three occasions during the year. They had both been members of the 1990s-formed pop group Steps. Bandmate Faye Tozer had her only single outside Steps in 2002, featuring on Russell Watson's "Someone Like You", which reached number ten.

Chad Kroeger had his first two top 10 singles as part of Nickelback in 2002, and also had a solo hit with "Hero". Beyoncé secured her first top 10 hit independent of Destiny's Child with "Work It Out", placing at number 7. Kelly Rowland also went solo in 2002, scoring a number-one hit with Nelly on "Dilemma".

Abs had eleven top 10 singles with Five between 1997 and 2001, but "What You Got" marked his solo debut. Nicole and Natalie Appleton had multiple chart hits with All Saints but appeared in the chart for the first time in 2002 as a duo.

Irv Gotti had his first official credit as an artist in 2002 on "Down 4 U" but he had made the top 10 previously as a producer. John Otway featured on The Crowd's charity single "You'll Never Walk Alone" in 1985, reaching number one. "Bunsen Burner" marked his return to the chart and his only solo top 10 hit. Ja Rule participated on the charity single "What's Going On" in 2001 but the collaboration with Ashanti, "Always on Time", was her first official lead credit. Justin Timberlake launched his solo career in 2002 with "Like I Love You", leaving NSync after their last single together, "Girlfriend".

Songs from films
Original songs from various films entered the top 10 throughout the year. These included "Bad Intentions" (from The Wash), "World of Our Own" (You Wish!), "The World's Greatest" (Ali), "Me Julie" (Ali G Indahouse), "I'm Not a Girl, Not Yet a Woman" (Crossroads), "Hero" (Spider-Man), "Here I Am" (Spirit: Stallion of the Cimarron), "Boys" and "Work It Out" (Austin Powers in Goldmember), "Livin' It Up" (Friday After Next), "Black Suits Comin' (Nod Ya Head)" (Men in Black II), "Die Another Day" (Die Another Day), "What's Your Flava?" (What a Girl Wants) and "Lose Yourself" (8 Mile).

Charity singles
A number of singles recorded for charity reached the top 10 in the charts in 2002. The Sport Relief single was a new version of Elton John's "Your Song", featuring Italian tenor Alessandro Safina alongside John, peaking at number four on 27 July 2002.

Will Young recorded the Children in Need single for 2002, the double-A side "Don't Let Me Down"/"You and I". It was his fourth successive top 2 single and reached number two on 30 November 2002.

Best-selling singles
Will Young had the best-selling single of the year with "Anything is Possible"/"Evergreen", his first recording after beating Gareth Gates to the Pop Idol title. The single spent six weeks in the top 10 (including three weeks at number one), sold almost 1.8 million copies and was certified 3× platinum by the BPI. Gates' "Unchained Melody" came in second place, selling over 1.3 million copies and losing out by around 400,000 sales. Enrique Iglesias's "Hero", "Dilemma" from Nelly & Kelly Rowland, and "A Little Less Conversation" by Elvis vs. JXL made up the top five. Singles by Gareth Gates ("Anyone of Us (Stupid Mistake)"), Las Ketchup, Shakira, Liberty X and Eminem were also in the top ten best-selling singles of the year.

"Anything is Possible"/"Evergreen" was ranked as the best-selling single of the decade, while "Unchained Melody" (2) also ranked in the top 10 best-selling singles of the 2000s.

Top-ten singles

Entries by artist

The following table shows artists who achieved two or more top 10 entries in 2002, including singles that reached their peak in 2001 or 2003. The figures include both main artists and featured artists, while appearances on ensemble charity records are also counted for each artist. The total number of weeks an artist spent in the top ten in 2002 is also shown.

Notes

 "Sk8er Boi" reached its peak of number eight on 11 January 2003 (week ending).
 Released as the official single for Children in Need in 2001.
 "My Sweet Lord" originally peaked at number-one upon its initial release in 1971. It was re-released as a single in January 2002, less than two months after George Harrison's death from lung cancer and reached number-one again for a single week.
 Released as the official single for Sport Relief.
 P Diddy, Usher and Loon all sang on "I Need a Girl (Part One)" but only Usher recorded the second song on the double-A side single, "U Don't Have to Call".
 Gareth Gates and Will Young both sang on "The Long and Winding Road" but only Gates recorded the second song on the double-A side single, "Suspicious Minds".
 Released as the official single for Children in Need.
 Figure includes appearances on Ja Rule's "Always on Time", Fat Joe's "What's Luv?" and Irv Gotti presents The Inc.'s "Down 4 U".
 Figure includes solo work and recordings with the group Nickelback.
 Figure includes appearance on MC Romeo's "It's All Gravy".
 Figure includes single that peaked in 2001.
 Figure includes appearances on City High's "Caramel" and Missy Elliot's "4 My People".
 Figure includes appearance on Irv Gotti presents The Inc.'s "Down 4 U".
 Figure includes a top 10 hit with the group So Solid Crew.
 S Club 7 changed their name to S Club after Paul Cattermole left the group in March 2002.
 Figure includes single that peaked in 2003.
 Figure includes appearance on Blue's "Sorry Seems to Be the Hardest Word".
 Figure includes appearance on Flip & Fill's "True Love Never Dies".

See also
2002 in British music
List of number-one singles from the 2000s (UK)

References
General

Specific

External links
2002 singles chart archive at the Official Charts Company (click on relevant week)

2002 record charts
2002 in British music
2002